Krasny Vyselok is a rural locality (a settlement) in Chernyansky District, Belgorod Oblast, Russia. The population was 50 as of 2010. There is 1 street.

Geography 
Krasny Vyselok is located 7 km northwest of Chernyanka (the district's administrative centre) by road. Krasny Ostrov is the nearest rural locality.

References 

Rural localities in Chernyansky District